Konstantinos Konstantinou (born 8 October 1999) is a Cypriot football player who plays as a forward.

Club career
He made his Cypriot First Division debut for AEK Larnaca on 14 May 2016 in a game against Nea Salamis Famagusta as a 67th-minute substitute for Konstantinos Anthimou.

References

External links
 

1999 births
Living people
Cypriot footballers
Association football forwards
Cypriot First Division players
AEK Larnaca FC players
Ethnikos Achna FC players
Enosis Neon Paralimni FC players
Cyprus youth international footballers